Polygrammodes koepckei is a moth in the family Crambidae. It was described by Eugene G. Munroe in 1958. It is found in Peru.

References

Spilomelinae
Moths described in 1958
Moths of South America